Magnus is a 2007 Estonian drama film directed by Kadri Kõusaar.

The film talks about a story of a teenager Magnus, who don't see point to live, and wants to commit suicide. His father get to know Magnus' idea and tries to change Magnus' mind.

This film is the first Estonian film which was chosen to the official program of Cannes Film Festival.

The film has had judicial problems. Eg Tallinn Circuit Court prohibited to show this film for audience until 2025.

Cast

References

External links
 
 Magnus (Estonian film), entry in Estonian Film Database (EFIS)

2007 films
Estonian drama films
Estonian-language films